El Hadjeb is a town and commune in Biskra Province, Algeria. According to the 1998 census it has a population of 8,394. It is at 34°47′25″n, 5°35′49″e.

At the 1998 census the population was 8394 but by the 2008 census it had grown to 10126.

References

Communes of Biskra Province
Biskra Province